Tatana Island is located in the National Capital District of Papua New Guinea. Located in the North-West electorate of Port Moresby.

All the settlement on the island is concentrated in a strip of buildings along the northern shore, simply known as Tatana. This settlement is connected to the mainland by an artificial causeway built by the United States Army during World War II, which carries a road link.

See also
Naval Base Port Moresby

References

National Capital District (Papua New Guinea)
Suburbs of Port Moresby
Islands of Papua New Guinea